Maurizio P. Vasco, television director, video journalist, author, was born in Italy (1955) and raised amid Apulia, Tuscany and Milan where he studied History, Photography and Television after he attended the Naval School of La Maddalena-Sardinia.

He took his first steps in the Media Industry in 1978, publishing his photos on Weekend Magazine and his stories on Universo's Comics.

He completed his education in New York City in the early 1980s through the New School for Social Research and The Global Village Video Studies Center.

Television
He is a former permanent employee of Videotime-Mediaset, contributor of Italian and International Media Organizations, including: RAI, Mediaset, Telepiu' (actual SKY), Studio Pontaccio, Rewire.com.
MPV has directed and/or produced numerous television programs and series including: Elton John- the One, Madonna's at the Roxy in 1983, Soccer's Stars and Legends, "The Lie Detector" (La Macchina della Verita') with Giancarlo Santalmassi, Scrondo, "Focus", "Viva Le Donne", Moda, Mr. Billion (Mister Miliardo), Tandem, Notorious, "Bim Bum Bam" with Paolo Bonolis, "The Milan International Commercial-Film Award " with Fiorello, "Mediaset's All Stars Christmas Promo" as Production Manager and "Fine Secolo"(the End of the Century) with Adriano Sofri. He has been rewarded at 1984-1989 editions of Filmmaker the Milan Independent Film Festival. Maurizio P Vasco, is an Accredited Senior Member of the New York's Foreign Press since 1997.

Writing
He has written the first edition of Mister Papa -together with Abel Ferrara and Fernanda Pivano- (the controversial Passage to Italy of Ernest Hemingway ), The Miracle of the Bell Tower (a metaphorical return to an idealized South)  "Human Inter-courses Vortex" a grotesque drama about the HIV 's fear/paranoia and Lyons and the East Village Tales  (autobiographical novel). In 1996 he founded Alpahazet Magazine and Spirals, two Internet Ventures and Propaganda, a creative circle of recruiting and developing for the New York's hospitality industry. 
New projects: "Desperate House Husbands" the stories of four divorced (forced to house) Italian-Americans New Yorkers and " Ash is what remains of a fire" (the epistolary of an ended story): works in progress. Two of his stories/articles have been published on Corriere della Sera and La Repubblica Cultural pages. He has written also, two Facebook-diaries:  "Carpe that fuc@#ing diem" , Volume 1 and 2, now available on Amazon as eBooks. His new memoire "Marry the Chef - Capo-" will be published soon.
"The Enigma of the Maltese Saint Croix" , a novel, is his last fatigue.

Travels
He has extensively traveled and resided for many years in Africa, Middle East, India, Asia, Europe and USA. 
His motto: Victoria Nobis Vitae -Life itself is a victory-(Engraved on the Battleship "Vittorio Veneto" the Italian Navy Admiral Vessel, where he served in 1974).

Maurizio P Vasco is also a certified maritime captain (former Italian Navy J. Officer) and holds an international license as a sailing/motor boat skipper. He resides among New York City and the Virgin Islands.

Chef Vasco
Since 1993 MPV has, parallel to his primary career, cultivated a passion for gastronomy, wines and culinary arts: He is a retired chef, restaurateur and gastronome who has created and realized menus for many Manhattan ventures as: Anarchy Cafe, Bacco, Gallo Nero, Taci Opera, Porta Toscana, Mambo.

References

The New School alumni
Italian film directors
American people of Italian descent
Italian chefs